The Barnaul Higher Military Aviation School for Pilots named after Chief Marshal of Aviation K. A. Vershinin (Barnaul VVAUL) (Барнаульское высшее военное авиационное училище летчиков им. Главного Маршала авиации К.А. Вершинина (БВВАУЛ))- was a flying training flight school of the Soviet Air Forces in the city of Barnaul (Altai Krai). It formed part of the Air Forces of the Siberian Military District.

History of creation 
The school was established on the basis of the Decree of the Council of Ministers of the Soviet Union of August 18, 1966, to train front-line aviation (bomber, fighter, fighter-bomber aviation, and ground attack aviation pilots.

The 44th Training Aviation Regiment (UAP) was based at Panfilovo (st. Kalmanka), the 96th UAP - city of Kamen-on-Obi, and the 59th UAP at Slavgorod.

By the Decree of the Council of Ministers of the USSR of April 15, 1974 and the order of the Minister of Defense of the USSR of April 30, 1974 in order to perpetuate the memory of the outstanding Soviet military leader Chief Marshal of Aviation Konstantin Vershinin, the school was named after him. From this period, the school began to be called: "Barnaul Higher Military Aviation School for Pilots named after Chief Marshal of Aviation K. A. Vershinin."

The school was disestablished in 1999.

Commanders 
From 1966 to 1999, the heads of the Barnaul VVAUL were:
 December 14, 1966 - February 26, 1970: Major General of Aviation Filimonov, Viktor Nikolaevich
 February 26, 1970 - October 8, 1971: Colonel Lysenko, Ivan Anatolyevich
 October 8, 1971 - October 22, 1975: Major General of Aviation Parfenov, Alexander Alexandrovich
 October 22, 1975 - June 14, 1979: Major General of Aviation Goncharenko, Anatoly Nikolaevich
 June 14, 1979 - November 15, 1983: Major General of Aviation Serazhim, Alexei Mikhailovich
 November 15, 1983 - September 16, 1987: Major General of Aviation Yanakov, Yakim Ivanovich
 September 17, 1987 - June 21, 1993: Major General of Aviation Pozdnyakov, Vladimir Dmitrievich
 November 2, 1993 - April 28, 1997: Major General of Aviation Maksimov, Anatoly Nikolaevich
 April 28, 1997 - March 31, 1999: Colonel Kononov, Yuri Ivanovich

References

External links
 
 
 

Flying training schools of the Soviet Union
Military units and formations established in 1966